The 1987–88 Seattle SuperSonics season was the 21st season of the Seattle SuperSonics in the National Basketball Association (NBA). It was Bernie Bickerstaff's first season with a winning percentage above .500, coaching the Sonics to a 44–38 record. However, in the 1988 NBA Playoffs, they lost in five games to the Denver Nuggets in the first round. Xavier McDaniel was selected for the 1988 NBA All-Star Game.

Offseason

Draft picks

Seattle selected future hall of famer Scottie Pippen in the first round thanks to a pick acquired from the New York Knicks, but traded him on draft day to the Chicago Bulls for Olden Polynice and two future conditional draft picks.

Roster

1987–88 Salaries

Sources:
 Basketball Reference: SEA Salaries

Regular season

Season standings

Record vs. opponents

Game log

|- align="center" bgcolor="ffbbbb"
|| 1 || November 6, 19877:30 pm PST || @ L.A. Lakers || L 109–113 || Tom Chambers (20) || || || The Forum17,505 || 0–1
|- align="center" bgcolor="bbffbb"
|| 2 || November 7 || Phoenix Suns || 96-112 || Dale Ellis (27) || || || Seattle Center Coliseum14,252 || 1–1
|- align="center" bgcolor="ffbbbb"
|| 3 || November 10 || Dallas Mavericks || 117-101 || Dale Ellis (28) || || || Seattle Center Coliseum10,447 || 1–2
|- align="center" bgcolor="ffbbbb"
|| 4 || November 12 || vs San Antonio Spurs || 123-118 || Xavier McDaniel (23) || || || HemisFair Arena6,399 || 1–3
|- align="center" bgcolor="bbffbb"
|| 5 || November 13 || vs Dallas Mavericks || 95-103 || Dale Ellis (22) || || || Reunion Arena17,007 || 2–3
|- align="center" bgcolor="ffbbbb"
|| 6 || November 15 || vs Houston Rockets || 108-106 || Dale Ellis (34) || || || The Summit16,611 || 2–4
|- align="center" bgcolor="bbffbb"
|| 7 || November 18 || Portland Trail Blazers || 114-120 || Xavier McDaniel (32) || || || Seattle Center Coliseum8,461 || 3–4
|- align="center" bgcolor="bbffbb"
|| 8 || November 20 || Milwaukee Bucks || 97-99 || Xavier McDaniel (30) || || || Seattle Center Coliseum14,601 || 4–4
|- align="center" bgcolor="bbffbb"
|| 9 || November 21 || Washington Bullets || 103-124 || Xavier McDaniel (28) || || || Seattle Center Coliseum13,437 || 5–4
|- align="center" bgcolor="bbffbb"
|| 10 || November 24, 19877:30 pm PST || L.A. Lakers || W 103–85 || Xavier McDaniel (34) || || || Seattle Center Coliseum14,634 || 6–4
|- align="center" bgcolor="ffbbbb"
|| 11 || November 27 || vs Boston Celtics || 117-112 || Dale Ellis (37) || || || Boston Garden14,890 || 6–5
|- align="center" bgcolor="ffbbbb"
|| 12 || November 28 || vs Indiana Pacers || 131-115 || Dale Ellis (29) || || || Market Square Arena11,538 || 6–6
|-

|- align="center" bgcolor="bbffbb"
|| 13 || December 1 || vs New York Knicks || 109-112 || Dale Ellis (37) || || || Madison Square Garden (IV)11,424 || 7–6
|- align="center" bgcolor="ffbbbb"
|| 14 || December 2 || vs Cleveland Cavaliers || 104-102 || Dale Ellis (25) || || || Coliseum at Richfield6,207 || 7–7
|- align="center" bgcolor="ffbbbb"
|| 15 || December 4 || vs Philadelphia 76ers || 118-105 || Tom Chambers (24) || || || The Spectrum13,115 || 7–8
|- align="center" bgcolor="bbffbb"
|| 16 || December 5 || vs Washington Bullets || 99-115 || Xavier McDaniel (26) || || || Capital Centre11,604 || 8–8
|- align="center" bgcolor="bbffbb"
|| 17 || December 8 || Cleveland Cavaliers || 96-107 || Dale EllisXavier McDaniel(25) || || || Seattle Center Coliseum8,520 || 9–8
|- align="center" bgcolor="ffbbbb"
|| 18 || December 10 || vs Los Angeles Clippers || 113-96 || Dale Ellis (20) || || || Los Angeles Memorial Sports Arena5,852 || 9–9
|- align="center" bgcolor="bbffbb"
|| 19 || December 12 || Los Angeles Clippers || 95-116 || Xavier McDaniel (35) || || || Seattle Center Coliseum10,623 || 10–9
|- align="center" bgcolor="ffbbbb"
|| 20 || December 14 || vs Utah Jazz || 116-95 || Dale Ellis (29) || || || Salt Palace12,212 || 10–10
|- align="center" bgcolor="ffbbbb"
|| 21 || December 15 || vs Portland Trail Blazers || 128-109 || Xavier McDaniel (22) || || || Memorial Coliseum12,666 || 10–11
|- align="center" bgcolor="bbffbb"
|| 22 || December 17 || Sacramento Kings || 109-114 || Tom Chambers (42) || || || Seattle Center Coliseum10,238 || 11–11
|- align="center" bgcolor="bbffbb"
|| 23 || December 19 || vs Golden State Warriors || 102-129 || Xavier McDaniel (32) || || || Oakland-Alameda County Coliseum Arena12,998 || 12–11
|- align="center" bgcolor="ffbbbb"
|| 24 || December 20, 19877:30 pm PST || @ L.A. Lakers || L 94–103 || Dale Ellis (24) || || || The Forum17,505 || 12–12
|- align="center" bgcolor="bbffbb"
|| 25 || December 23 || vs Phoenix Suns || 102-103 || Dale Ellis (35) || || || Arizona Veterans Memorial Coliseum10,351 || 13–12
|- align="center" bgcolor="ffbbbb"
|| 26 || December 26 || vs Denver Nuggets || 115-111 || Xavier McDaniel (26) || || || McNichols Sports Arena12,403 || 13–13
|- align="center" bgcolor="bbffbb"
|| 27 || December 28 || Denver Nuggets || 100-108 || Xavier McDaniel (30) || || || Seattle Center Coliseum13,007 || 14–13
|- align="center" bgcolor="bbffbb"
|| 28 || December 30 || Boston Celtics || 105-111 || Tom Chambers (31) || || || Seattle Center Coliseum14,850 || 15–13
|-

|- align="center" bgcolor="bbffbb"
|| 29 || January 2 || Philadelphia 76ers || 114-116 || Xavier McDaniel (35) || || || Seattle Center Coliseum14,250 || 16–13
|- align="center" bgcolor="ffbbbb"
|| 30 || January 5 || vs Portland Trail Blazers || 126-114 || Dale Ellis (32) || || || Memorial Coliseum12,666 || 16–14
|- align="center" bgcolor="bbffbb"
|| 31 || January 6 || Houston Rockets || 95-110 || Tom Chambers (46) || || || Seattle Center Coliseum11,289 || 17–14
|- align="center" bgcolor="bbffbb"
|| 32 || January 9 || San Antonio Spurs || 133-141 || Dale Ellis (47) || || || Seattle Center Coliseum11,565 || 18–14
|- align="center" bgcolor="ffbbbb"
|| 33 || January 10 || vs Sacramento Kings || 109-108 || Dale Ellis (30) || || || ARCO Arena (I)10,333 || 18–15
|- align="center" bgcolor="bbffbb"
|| 34 || January 13 || Golden State Warriors || 115-144 || Xavier McDaniel (30) || || || Seattle Center Coliseum7,909 || 19–15
|- align="center" bgcolor="bbffbb"
|| 35 || January 15 || Utah Jazz || 105-124 || Dale Ellis (39) || || || Seattle Center Coliseum10,418 || 20–15
|- align="center" bgcolor="bbffbb"
|| 36 || January 16 || vs Los Angeles Clippers || 112-114 (OT) || Dale Ellis (41) || || || Los Angeles Memorial Sports Arena8,697 || 21–15
|- align="center" bgcolor="bbffbb"
|| 37 || January 18 || Indiana Pacers || 105-115 || Dale Ellis (29) || || || Seattle Center Coliseum10,151 || 22–15
|- align="center" bgcolor="bbffbb"
|| 38 || January 20 || New York Knicks || 96-108 || Xavier McDaniel (41) || || || Seattle Center Coliseum11,767 || 23–15
|- align="center" bgcolor="bbffbb"
|| 39 || January 22, 19887:30 pm PST || Detroit || W 109–106 || Dale Ellis (47) || || || Seattle Center Coliseum14,737 || 24–15
|- align="center" bgcolor="ffbbbb"
|| 40 || January 24, 198812:30 pm PST || L.A. Lakers || L 109–116 || Xavier McDaniel (35) || || || Seattle Center Coliseum14,739 || 24–16
|- align="center" bgcolor="bbffbb"
|| 41 || January 26 || vs Sacramento Kings || 100-116 || Dale Ellis (42) || || || ARCO Arena (I)10,333 || 25–16
|- align="center" bgcolor="ffbbbb"
|| 42 || January 29 || vs Dallas Mavericks || 117-109 || Dale Ellis (35) || || || Reunion Arena17,007 || 25–17
|- align="center" bgcolor="ffbbbb"
|| 43 || January 30 || vs San Antonio Spurs || 112-102 (OT) || || || Xavier McDanielTom Chambers(27) || HemisFair Arena8,319 || 25–18
|-

|- align="center" bgcolor="ffbbbb"
|| 44 || February 1 || vs Utah Jazz || 105-100 || Dale Ellis (40) || || || Salt Palace12,212 || 25–19
|- align="center" bgcolor="ffbbbb"
|| 45 || February 4 || Atlanta Hawks || 119-109 || Dale Ellis (36) || || || Seattle Center Coliseum14,611 || 25–20
|- align="center" bgcolor="ffbbbb"
|| 46 || February 9 || vs Portland Trail Blazers || 139-123 || Tom Chambers (21) || || || Memorial Coliseum12,666 || 25–21
|- align="center" bgcolor="bbffbb"
|| 47 || February 11 || Houston Rockets || 115-120 || Tom Chambers (36) || || || Seattle Center Coliseum13,038 || 26–21
|- align="center" bgcolor="ffbbbb"
|| 48 || February 13 || vs Golden State Warriors || 109-95 || Dale Ellis (28) || || || Oakland-Alameda County Coliseum Arena13,502 || 26–22
|- align="center" bgcolor="ffbbbb"
|| 49 || February 15 || Dallas Mavericks || 128-122 (OT) || Tom Chambers (29) || || || Seattle Center Coliseum13,492 || 26–23
|- align="center" bgcolor="ffbbbb"
|| 50 || February 17 || vs Milwaukee Bucks || 115-93 || Dale Ellis (26) || || || MECCA Arena11,052 || 26–24
|- align="center" bgcolor="ffbbbb"
|| 51 || February 18, 19884:30 pm PST || @ Detroit || L 95–108 || Tom Chambers (24) || || || Pontiac Silverdome24,482 || 26–25
|- align="center" bgcolor="bbffbb"
|| 52 || February 20 || vs New Jersey Nets || 101-113 || Dale Ellis (30) || || || Brendan Byrne Arena11,137 || 27–25
|- align="center" bgcolor="ffbbbb"
|| 53 || February 21 || vs Atlanta Hawks || 129-113 || Dale Ellis (31) || || || Omni Coliseum15,437 || 27–26
|- align="center" bgcolor="ffbbbb"
|| 54 || February 23 || vs Chicago Bulls || 104-97 (OT) || Dale Ellis (34) || || || Chicago Stadium17,648 || 27–27
|- align="center" bgcolor="bbffbb"
|| 55 || February 26 || Sacramento Kings || 130-133 || Dale Ellis (37) || || || Seattle Center Coliseum11,632 || 28–27
|- align="center" bgcolor="bbffbb"
|| 56 || February 27 || Golden State Warriors || 111-114 || Dale Ellis (30) || || || Seattle Center Coliseum10,752 || 29–27

|- align="center" bgcolor="bbffbb"
|| 57 || March 1, 19887:30 pm PST || L.A. Lakers || W 114–100 || Dale Ellis (26) || || || Seattle Center Coliseum14,850 || 30–27
|- align="center" bgcolor="ffbbbb"
|| 58 || March 4 || Utah Jazz || 125-110 || Tom Chambers (29) || || || Seattle Center Coliseum11,268 || 30–28
|- align="center" bgcolor="ffbbbb"
|| 59 || March 5 || Denver Nuggets || 115-102 || Dale Ellis (27) || || || Seattle Center Coliseum13,287 || 30–29
|- align="center" bgcolor="bbffbb"
|| 60 || March 8 || vs Golden State Warriors || 116-121 (OT) || Dale Ellis (29) || || || Oakland-Alameda County Coliseum Arena11,178 || 31–29
|- align="center" bgcolor="bbffbb"
|| 61 || March 9 || vs Sacramento Kings || 97-106 || Dale Ellis (24) || || || ARCO Arena (I)10,333 || 32–29
|- align="center" bgcolor="bbffbb"
|| 62 || March 13 || New Jersey Nets || 102-115 || Tom Chambers (25) || || || Seattle Center Coliseum9,040 || 33–29
|- align="center" bgcolor="ffbbbb"
|| 63 || March 15 || vs Phoenix Suns || 111-90 || Dale Ellis (38) || || || Arizona Veterans Memorial Coliseum11,159 || 33–30
|- align="center" bgcolor="ffbbbb"
|| 64 || March 17 || vs Houston Rockets || 115-106 || Tom Chambers (24) || || || The Summit16,611 || 33–31
|- align="center" bgcolor="bbffbb"
|| 65 || March 18 || vs San Antonio Spurs || 110-118 (OT) || Xavier McDaniel (31) || || || HemisFair Arena7,353 || 34–31
|- align="center" bgcolor="ffbbbb"
|| 66 || March 20 || vs Denver Nuggets || 108-95 || Dale Ellis (23) || || || McNichols Sports Arena13,117 || 34–32
|- align="center" bgcolor="bbffbb"
|| 67 || March 23 || Portland Trail Blazers || 108-118 || Dale Ellis (35) || || || Seattle Center Coliseum14,250 || 35–32
|- align="center" bgcolor="bbffbb"
|| 68 || March 26 || Los Angeles Clippers || 98-131 || Dale Ellis (27) || || || Seattle Center Coliseum11,650 || 36–32
|- align="center" bgcolor="bbffbb"
|| 69 || March 29 || Chicago Bulls || 103-106 || Tom Chambers (34) || || || Seattle Center Coliseum14,850 || 37–32
|- align="center" bgcolor="ffbbbb"
|| 70 || March 31 || San Antonio Spurs || 117-115 || Dale EllisTom Chambers(27) || || || Seattle Center Coliseum9,210 || 37–33

|- align="center" bgcolor="bbffbb"
|| 71 || April 2 || Phoenix Suns || 107-151 || Xavier McDaniel (26) || || || Seattle Center Coliseum9,790 || 38–33
|- align="center" bgcolor="ffbbbb"
|| 72 || April 5, 19887:30 pm PDT || @ L.A. Lakers || L 90–94 || Tom Chambers (21) || || || The Forum17,505 || 38–34
|- align="center" bgcolor="bbffbb"
|| 73 || April 6 || Golden State Warriors || 102-114 || Derrick McKey (18) || || || Seattle Center Coliseum9,520 || 39–34
|- align="center" bgcolor="bbffbb"
|| 74 || April 8 || Portland Trail Blazers || 100-114 || Xavier McDaniel (34) || || || Seattle Center Coliseum14,438 || 40–34
|- align="center" bgcolor="ffbbbb"
|| 75 || April 9 || Houston Rockets || 108-104 || Xavier McDaniel (27) || || || Seattle Center Coliseum13,584 || 40–35
|- align="center" bgcolor="bbffbb"
|| 76 || April 13 || Los Angeles Clippers || 92-113 || Xavier McDaniel (23) || || || Seattle Center ColiseumNot announced || 41–35
|- align="center" bgcolor="bbffbb"
|| 77 || April 15 || Dallas Mavericks || 88-115 || Alton Lister (19) || || || Seattle Center Coliseum12,576 || 42–35
|- align="center" bgcolor="ffbbbb"
|| 78 || April 16 || vs Phoenix Suns || 121-119 (OT) || Sedale Threatt (31) || || || Arizona Veterans Memorial Coliseum11,406 || 42–36
|- align="center" bgcolor="ffbbbb"
|| 79 || April 19 || vs Denver Nuggets || 134-114 || Tom Chambers (29) || || || McNichols Sports Arena14,478 || 42–37
|- align="center" bgcolor="bbffbb"
|| 80 || April 20 || Phoenix Suns || 98-121 || Dale Ellis (24) || || || Seattle Center ColiseumNot announced || 43–37
|- align="center" bgcolor="ffbbbb"
|| 81 || April 22 || Utah Jazz || 110-109 || Dale Ellis (20) || || || Seattle Center Coliseum14,250 || 43–38
|- align="center" bgcolor="bbffbb"
|| 82 || April 24 || vs Los Angeles Clippers || 100-109 || Russ SchoeneTom Chambers(20) || || || Los Angeles Memorial Sports ArenaNot announced || 44–38

 Green background indicates win.
 Red background indicates loss.

Playoffs

|- align="center" bgcolor="#ffcccc"
| 1
| April 29
| @ Denver
| L 123–126
| Tom Chambers (29)
| Xavier McDaniel (10)
| McDaniel, McMillan (8)
| McNichols Sports Arena17,022
| 0–1
|- align="center" bgcolor="#ccffcc"
| 2
| May 1
| @ Denver
| W 111–91
| Dale Ellis (24)
| Xavier McDaniel (17)
| Nate McMillan (6)
| McNichols Sports Arena17,022
| 1–1
|- bgcolor="ffcccc"
| 3
| May 3
| Denver
| L 114–125
| Tom Chambers (34)
| Xavier McDaniel (12)
| Nate McMillan (9)
| Seattle Center Coliseum14,250
| 1–2
|- align="center" bgcolor="#ccffcc"
| 4
| May 5
| Denver
| W 127–117
| Xavier McDaniel (27)
| Derrick McKey (7)
| Danny Young (8)
| Seattle Center Coliseum14,250
| 2–2
|- align="center" bgcolor="#ffcccc"
| 5
| May 7
| @ Denver
| L 96–115
| Tom Chambers (23)
| Alton Lister (8)
| Xavier McDaniel (5)
|Seattle Center Coliseum16,040
| 2–3

Statistics

Season

1. Statistics with the SuperSonics.

Playoffs

Awards and records

Awards
 Derrick McKey earned an NBA All-Rookie First Team selection.
 Xavier McDaniel was selected to participate in the 1988 NBA All-Star Game.

Records

Transactions

Overview

Trades

Free agents

Additions

Subtractions

2. Received a conditional 1990 second round pick as compensation.

References

See also
 1987–88 NBA season

Seattle SuperSonics seasons